Judith Wiesner won in the final 6–3, 6–7, 6–1 against Barbara Paulus.

Seeds
A champion seed is indicated in bold text while text in italics indicates the round in which that seed was eliminated.

  Conchita Martínez (first round)
  Barbara Paulus (final)
  Isabel Cueto (quarterfinals)
  Sandra Cecchini (second round)
  Bettina Fulco (first round)
  Judith Wiesner (champion)
  Sandra Wasserman (first round)
  Neige Dias (first round)

Draw

External links
 1989 Arcachon Cup Draw

Arcachon Cup
1989 WTA Tour